Pseudonocardia nematodicida is a Gram-positive bacterium from the genus of Pseudonocardia which has been isolated from mangrove soil from the Dongzhaigang National Nature Reserve in China.

References

Pseudonocardia
Bacteria described in 2015